Golnur Nagimullovna Postnikova (born 27 July 1964 in Chusovoy) is a Russian former alpine skier who competed in the 1988 Winter Olympics.

References

External links
 

1964 births
Living people
Russian female alpine skiers
Olympic alpine skiers of the Soviet Union
Alpine skiers at the 1988 Winter Olympics
People from Chusovoy
Sportspeople from Perm Krai